S&S Productions is a Canadian television production company. The firm grew out of Smith & Smith, a sketch comedy series starring the married comedy duo of Steve and Morag Smith, and also produced their subsequent series Me & Max, The Comedy Mill and The Red Green Show. The firm was established by the Smiths, along with Steve Smith's brother David as an additional partner.

Following the success of The Red Green Show in the early 1990s, the firm branched out to produce other entertainment and informational programming not directly starring the duo. The company also produced Duct Tape Forever, a feature film spinoff of Red Green, but remains focused on television rather than film production.

http://www.ssp.ca/

Produced by S&S 

 An American in Canada
 Anything I Can Do
 Balance: Television for Living Well
 The Comedy Mill
 The 5th Quadrant
 Gardener's Journal
 History Bites
 Jeff Ltd.
 listen missy!
 Me & Max
 Men on Women
 The Red Green Show
 Smith & Smith
 Sons of Butcher
 Steve Smith Playhouse
 Street Eats
 Supertown Challenge

References

External links

Television production companies of Canada
Mass media companies established in 1980
1980 establishments in Ontario